The common sandpiper (Actitis hypoleucos) is a small Palearctic wader. This bird and its American sister species, the spotted sandpiper (A. macularia), make up the genus Actitis. They are parapatric and replace each other geographically; stray birds of either species may settle down with breeders of the other and hybridize. Hybridization has also been reported between the common sandpiper and the green sandpiper, a basal species of the closely related shank genus Tringa.

Taxonomy 
The common sandpiper was formally described by the Swedish naturalist Carl Linnaeus in 1758 in the tenth edition of his Systema Naturae under the binomial name Tringa hypoleucos. The species is now placed together with the spotted sandpiper in the genus Actitis that was introduced in 1811 by the German zoologist Johann Karl Wilhelm Illiger. The genus name Actitis is from Ancient Greek aktites meaning "coast-dweller" from akte meaning "coast". The specific epithet hypoleucos combines the Ancient Greek hupo meaning "beneath" with leukos meaning "white". The species is monotypic: no subspecies are recognised.

Description
It has greyish-brown upperparts, white underparts, short dark-yellowish legs and feet, and a bill with a pale base and dark tip. In winter plumage, they are duller and have more conspicuous barring on the wings, though this is still only visible at close range. Juveniles are more heavily barred above and have buff edges to the wing feathers.

This species is very similar to the slightly larger spotted sandpiper (A. macularia) in non-breeding plumage. But its darker legs and feet and the crisper wing pattern (visible in flight) tend to give it away, and of course they are only rarely found in the same location.

Distribution and migration
The common sandpiper breeds across most of temperate and subtropical Europe and Asia, and migrates to Africa, southern Asia and Australia in winter. The eastern edge of its migration route passes by Palau in Micronesia, where hundreds of birds may gather for a stop-over. They depart the Palau region for their breeding quarters around the last week of April to the first week of May.

Behaviour and ecology
It is a gregarious bird and is seen in large flocks, and has the distinctive stiff-winged flight, low over the water, of Actitis waders.

Breeding
It nests on the ground near freshwater. When threatened, the young may cling to their parent's body to be flown away to safety.

Feeding
The common sandpiper forages by sight on the ground or in shallow water, picking up small food items such as insects, crustaceans and other invertebrates; it may even catch insects in flight.

Conservation
It is widespread and common, and therefore classified as a species of least concern on the IUCN Red List but is a vulnerable species in some states of Australia. The purple sandpiper is one of the species to which the Agreement on the Conservation of African-Eurasian Migratory Waterbirds (AEWA) applies.

Relationship to humans
In the Nukumanu language of the Nukumanu Islands (Papua New Guinea), this species is usually called tiritavoi. Another Nukumanu name for it, matakakoni, exists, but this is considered somewhat taboo and not used when children and women are around. The reason for this is that matakakoni means "bird that walks a little, then copulates", in reference to the pumping tail and thrusting head movements the Actitis species characteristically perform during foraging.

References

External links

 Ageing and sexing (PDF; 5.5 MB) by Javier Blasco-Zumeta & Gerd-Michael Heinze
 Common sandpiper species text in The Atlas of Southern African Birds
 
 
 
 
 
 
 

Actitis
Wading birds
Birds of Eurasia
Birds described in 1758
Taxa named by Carl Linnaeus